Manchu Entertainment is an Indian film production company established by Lakshmi Manchu, daughter of actor Mohan Babu.

Film production

Film distribution

T.V production
Prematho Mee Lakshmi  (2011)

References

External links
ManchuEntertainment on Facebook
ManchuEntertainment on Twitter
ManchuEntertainment on YouTube

Film production companies based in Hyderabad, India
Film distributors of India
Year of establishment missing